Petros Bourdoulis (born 13 September 1970 in Georgian SSR) is a Greek former wrestler who competed in the 1992 Summer Olympics and in the 1996 Summer Olympics.

References

1970 births
Living people
Olympic wrestlers of Greece
Wrestlers at the 1992 Summer Olympics
Wrestlers at the 1996 Summer Olympics
Greek male sport wrestlers
Male sport wrestlers from Georgia (country)